Geoffrey Baron (or Barron; 1607–1651) was an Irish rebel.

The elder brother of Bonaventure Baron, Geoffrey acquired eminence in Ireland as a scholar and a lawyer in the reign of Charles I. He engaged actively in the affairs of the Irish confederates in 1642, and was appointed as their delegate to the court of France. Baron acted for a time as treasurer for the Irish Confederation, and throughout his career enjoyed a high character for probity and sincere devotion to the cause of his Roman Catholic countrymen. He strongly opposed the surrender of Limerick to the army of the parliament of England in 1651, and was consequently one of those excepted from pardon for life and estate by a special clause in the treaty of capitulation. When the parliamentarian troops entered Limerick in October 1651, Baron voluntarily surrendered himself, and was sentenced to death by a court of officers presided over by the lord-deputy, Henry Ireton. Edmund Ludlow, lieutenant-general of the horse, mentions that, in reply to Ireton, Baron answered "that it was not just to exclude him from mercy, because he had been engaged in the same cause" as the parliamentarians "pretended to fight for, the liberty and religion of his country." Baron was executed at Limerick, and met his fate with great intrepidity.

References

1607 births
1651 deaths
17th-century Irish people